The 2009–10 season was the 99th season in the history of Grenoble Foot 38 and the club's second consecutive season in the top flight of French football. In addition to the domestic league, Grenoble participated in this season's editions of the Coupe de France and the Coupe de la Ligue.

Players

First-team squad

Pre-season and friendlies

Competitions

Overall record

Ligue 1

League table

Results summary

Results by round

Matches

Coupe de France

Coupe de la Ligue

References

Grenoble Foot 38 seasons
Grenoble